Lorenzo James Hatch (July 16, 1856 - February 3, 1914) was an American artist best known for his work as a portrait engraver in Washington, D.C. and New York. He worked for the United States Bureau of Engraving and Printing, private bank note printers, and in China, assisting the government with establishing a government bureau of engraving and printing. His portrait of Ulysses S. Grant circulated from 1886-1891 on the $5.00 silver certificate, and his engraving of Abraham Lincoln continues to appear on today's $5 bill. 

Hatch was born in Hartford, New York and raised in Dorset, Vermont. He studied at the Washington Art Students' Club and with Robert Henri. Early in his career, he found his talent for engraving intricate portraits in metals. In 1874, the head of the United States Bureau of Engraving and Printing admired Hatch's portrait of George Washington on copper and hired him. During his time in Washington, D.C., Hatch spent his nights studying drawing and watercolor painting. However, his talent to engrave vignettes of presidents and other famous figures proved more impressive. In 1888, Hatch moved to Chicago to work for a private bank note company. There, he met Grace Harrison of California. They were married and had one son, Harrison in 1902. After taking a job in New York City with another bank note company, Hatch solidified his reputation in the field.

Around 1908, the Chinese government invited Hatch to establish a Bureau of Engraving and Printing modeled after that of the United States. He accepted a six-year contract to oversee the building of the bureau and train the Chinese to run the office. With his wife, their son, and sister-in-law Effie Harrision, Lorenzo moved to Peking. During his time in China, Lorenzo Hatch succeeded in building the foundations for a modern printing bureau. However, the Xinhai Revolution in China between 1911-1912 hindered completion. He described his experiences, perceptions, and insecurities of being in China to his family and friends through letters. Before his contract ended, Hatch died on February 3, 1914. His body was returned to Dorset, Vermont and is buried in Maple Hill Cemetery across from his boyhood home.

References 
 Smithsonian Institution archives, with biography
 
 The Artists of Bronxville: 1890-1930, Hudson River Museum, 1991, page 25.

American artists